Nuqat is a nonprofit organisation based in Kuwait that focuses on cultural development in the region. Diverse participants from all over the world join Nuqat throughout the year to discuss design, entrepreneurship, architecture, fine arts, technology, culture and every aspect of life that creativity permeates.

About
 
Nuqat grew out of frustration from the lack of empowering education for expression, inspiration, and creative thinking in the Middle East and North Africa.  Nuqat aims to address this by facilitating, enabling and nurturing a collaborative community that solve social challenges through creative thinking. Nuqat is primarily a platform providing cultural programming and community networking.
 
Nuqat, first known as "Nuqat Ala Al Huroof"  "started off with one objective in mind - to develop Arab creativity on all levels, encompassing design, advertising, architecture, fashion, production and all other pertinent social and cultural fields.

History
 
According to its founders, Nuqat was started out of "frustration with the lack of spirited exchange in the Middle East" and "with one objective in mind - to develop Arab creativity on all levels." The organisation was founded in 2009 with a two days consortium and began their intensive activities in 2010, hosting a conference, workshop and exhibition at the Gulf University of Science and Technology (Kuwait) on the theme of visual pollution. In 2012 Nuqat organised workshops, exhibitions and conferences under the heading The Lost City of Arabesque in both Kuwait and Dubai - the latter was produced in conjunction with the Dubai Culture and Arts Authority and Tashkeel and traced the route of traditional arts in Dubai to their modern counterparts.
 
2009: The First conference was conducted under the theme "Nuqat Ala Al Huroof" meaning "dotting the I's" with 3 speakers, 3 workshops, and 80 participants over 2 days.

2010: A bigger conference under the theme of "Visual Pollution in the Arab World" was conducted with 12 speakers, 9 workshops and 200 participants over 3 days.

2012: Nuqat was invited by Dubai Design Days to conduct the conference in Dubai as part of their program in March. The conference brought about 26 speakers, 12 workshops, and 200 attendees over 5 days. The same conference was completed in Kuwait. A decision was made to keep Kuwait as the main base with the big conference and conduct several small activities in the GCC and MENA.

2013: Nuqat received the support of the Ministry of State for Youth Affairs and conduced the conference with 27 speakers, 12 workshops, and 750 attendees over 7 days under the theme of "Executing Culture Shock."

2014: The theme was on "The Missing Link: Practicing the collective approach". We asked speakers to tackle a challenging part of the creative process: collaboration. Nuqat got its license as a non-profit company. Nuqat partnered with LOUD Art in Saudi Arabia to produce a second edition of their "Executing Culture Shock" program, which according to Nuqat ambassador Tala Saleh was a way to emphasize the "communal framework" of Nuqat as an Arab organization.

2015: With the theme "The Copy/Paste Syndrome", the 7 days program tackled the idea of originality along with the upsides and downsides of copying. The conference became a program, engaging local and regional cultural organisations to conduct their own activities as part of the program. Also, this year witnessed the launch of Nuqat Junior, the children creative education program.

2016: In 2016, Nuqat ran the annual conference on "The Seventh Sense: Powering the Creative Economy in the Middle East". This NUQAT conference looked at the ways the seventh sense, i.e the mechanism of the human mind that produces new ideas, can develop innovation in the industries of the Arab world and beyond. Looking at the idea of alternative energy, we proposed that creativity should play a larger role in powering our economies as we move forward. During the conference, we ran our first ever round of Exploration Sessions on three aspects of the Creative Economy. These Exploration Sessions brought together various academics, professionals, intellectuals, creatives, designers and more to discuss a given topic of the Creative Economy.

2018: Nuqat presented a special edition two-day forum titled "The Human Capital: Investing in Creativity for Social Impact". The forum was present to the public talks and discussion panels exploring various delving deeper into the creative economy and stimulating the collective wisdom of our minds and souls for the progress of our communities.

For the years of 2012, 2013, 2014, 2015, and 2016 the Kuwait edition of the Nuqat conference was hosted in the Amricani Cultural Centre (Dar al-Athar al-Islamiyyah) and the Sadu House hosted the workshops.

As for the 2018 forum, Nuqat looked elsewhere, and decided to take a different step concerning where the event would be held thus looked into the Sheikh Jaber Al Ahmad Cultural Centre, the recently opened Culture House/Opera House in Kuwait, JACC provides a space for dialogue to share and showcase skills and knowledge, giving younger voices a forum in which to speak. The cultural centre is a platform for educational and cultural exchange; moreover, it functions as an influential entertainment and culture powerhouse and productive space for the region.

Cultural programming
 
Nuqat regularly organizes art and design competitions, film screenings, exhibitions and other cultural events. In conjunction with 29Letters, a type foundry based in Beirut, Nuqat hosted the first annual Hourouf competition in 2014. Hourouf aims to identify in its pool of applicants new bilingual type designs in Arabic and Latin.
 
Amongst the films screened by Nuqat are Schehrezade's Diary by Zeina Daccache and short films by Kuwaiti directors including Dinosaur by Meqdad Al Kout.

Conferences 
Nuqat conferences invite regional and international thought leaders to participate in a curated form of talks, panel discussions, workshops and cultural events that are open to the public. Each conference is meant to explore a central idea.

Exploration Sessions (Nuqat On Tour) 
In 2016, Nuqat ran the annual conference under the topic "Powering the Creative Economy".

Simultaneously, Nuqat held a pilot series of Exploration Sessions in 2016 which looked at the following three topics: "Architecture and Urbanism", "Design Deficit in the Gulf" and "Funding the Creative Economy". These sessions bought together architects, academics, artists, writers, investors, designers and innovative thinkers to stimulate conversation and create a multi-dimensional understanding of the prevalent issues within three different fields.  Following from this analysis, actionable steps were outlined and published in a report by Nuqat.

Educational programs

Workshops 
Since 2009 Nuqat has offered dozens of workshops in a variety of practical and theoretical art and design subjects.  Studio Nuqat is a series of workshops and events offered by Nuqat. Nuqat provides skills building and industry immersion opportunities for teams and individuals (including students, professionals and hobbyists). The objective of Studio Nuqat is to provide a creative outlet that in turn serves to develop the creative capacities, vocational skills and networks of its participants. Studio Nuqat serves as a form of alternative learning as well as a continuing education platform.

Nuqat's street art workshop have led to public art interventions in Mubarakiya district and on the Sheraton roundabout at the heart of Kuwait City. Nuqat is currently offering a course series in photography, design and entrepreneurship.

Zain-Nuqat IN•DIG•GO 
In 2017, Nuqat went into partnership with Zain Group, the leading mobile telecom innovator in eight markets across the Middle East and Africa. Together, the two organisations are set to introduce a development initiative dubbed IN•DIG•GO, which is an alternative thematic-based educational program for children between the ages of 6 and 11 years. The program is aimed at strengthening the understanding of the participants, expanding their knowledge, and developing their soft and learning skills. The program is the first-of-its-kinds in the region and will be initially launched as a pilot supporting children of Zain employees in Kuwait. This pilot will act as a learning platform for all stakeholders and then after the intention is to roll out the program on a larger scale.

Partnerships
 
Nuqat workshops have received many different sponsors. In 2014 Jazeera Airways and IKEA provided materials and support for workshops in which participants created designs for the airlines and the furniture giant. In 2015, Alghanim industries sponsored Dr. Amar Behbehani's workshop "Innovative Entrepreneurship: A Creative Process" and Elevation Burger sponsored Wajha's workshop 'Social Design | Fi Al Wajha'.

References

Organizations based in Kuwait City
Kuwaiti culture